Harry Henry Russell, better known as Scott Russell (25 September 1868 – 28 August 1949), was an English singer, actor and theatre manager best known for his performances in the tenor roles with the D'Oyly Carte Opera Company.  He was the brother-in-law of D'Oyly Carte contralto Louie René.

Life and career
Russell was born in Great Malvern and studied singing with Gustave Garcia at the Royal Academy of Music.

Early career
Russell made his stage debut in the chorus of the Agnes Huntingdon Company in New Jersey in the United States.  His London debut came with the D'Oyly Carte Opera Company at the Savoy Theatre in 1893, where he created the role of Lord Dramaleigh in the original production of Utopia, Limited.  In 1895, he created the roles of Bertuccio in Mirette and Pedro Gomez in The Chieftain at the Savoy.  He also created the roles of Dr. Tannhauser in The Grand Duke (1896), He was in Weather or No (1896–97), and Count Cosmo in His Majesty (1897), among others.  Other roles with D'Oyly Carte in the 1890s included Mr. Box in Cox and Box, Cyril in Princess Ida, Leonard Meryll in The Yeomen of the Guard, Nanki-Poo in The Mikado, and Frederic in The Pirates of Penzance.

Russell played roles in the musical comedies including A Gaiety Girl (1894), Baron Golosh (1895), The Yashmak (1897), and the highly successful Veronique, The Geisha, A Greek Slave and San Toy (most at Daly's Theatre), between 1898 and 1902 under the management of George Edwardes.  From 1902 to 1904, Russell returned to D'Oyly Carte, appearing in his old tenor roles and adding to his repertoire the Duke of Dunstable in Patience, Earl Tolloller in Iolanthe, Marco in The Gondoliers and Ralph Rackstraw in H.M.S. Pinafore.

Later life and career
Russell appeared again at Daly's in 1906-07 in The Geisha, Amasis, and Les Merveilleuses, then left the stage for three years before returning in 1910 with the Beecham Light Opera Company. He continued to perform in London and on tour for another 28 years.  In 1932, he appeared in Derby Day.  Russell's last role in London was Locket in Frederic Austin's The Beggar's Opera in 1938.

Between 1920 and 1932, Russell served as the manager of the Lyric Theatre in Hammersmith.

He died in Great Malvern.

Recordings
In 1898, Russell recorded "Take a pair of sparkling eyes" from The Gondoliers.  This is generally regarded as being the first professionally produced recording of a song from a Gilbert and Sullivan opera.  Among many other recordings, he recorded "Take a Pair" again in 1899, and also recorded tenor songs from The Rose of Persia ("I Care Not If"), Princess Ida ("Would You Know"), and Utopia ,Limited ("A Tenor All Singers") in 1900. The last three of these appear on the Pearl CD "The Art of the Savoyard" (GEMM CD 9991).

References
 Introduction by Martyn Green.

External links
Info about Russell
Profile of Russell

1868 births
1949 deaths
People from Malvern, Worcestershire
English opera singers
Musicians from Worcestershire
Male actors from Worcestershire
Actor-managers
20th-century theatre managers